Eucalyptus platyphylla, commonly known as poplar gum or white gum, is a species of medium-sized tree that is endemic to Queensland. It has smooth. powdery bark, heart-shaped, egg-shaped to almost round leaves, flower buds in groups of seven, white flowers and conical to hemispherical fruit.

Description
It has smooth, powdery, pale pink to greenish white bark. Flowering occurs from June to October and the flowers are white.

Taxonomy and naming
Eucalyptus platyphylla was first formally described in 1859 by Ferdinand von Mueller in Journal of the Proceedings of the Linnean Society, Botany from material collected near the Burdekin River.<ref name="F.Muell.">{{cite journal |last1=von Mueller |first1=Ferdinand |title=Monograph of the eucalypti of tropical Australia |journal=Journal of the Proceedings of the Linnean Society, Botany |date=1859 |volume=3 |page=93 |url=https://www.biodiversitylibrary.org/item/8353#page/97/mode/1up |access-date=2 December 2019}}</ref> The specific epithet (playtphylla) is from ancient Greek words meaning "flat", "wide" or "broad" and "-leaved", referring to the broad leaves.

Distribution and habitat
Poplar gum is mostly found within  of the coast in soils that often remain west for long periods. It occurs from Horn Island in the Torres Strait to near Rockhampton.

Conservation status
This eucalypt is listed as "least concern" under the Queensland Government Nature Conservation Act 1992''.

See also
List of Eucalyptus species

References

Trees of Australia
platyphylla
Myrtales of Australia
Flora of Queensland
Taxa named by Ferdinand von Mueller
Plants described in 1859